Tineola is a genus of moths the family Tineidae. There are two species, including the familiar common clothes moth (T. bisselliella).

Species:
Tineola anaphecola  Gozmány, 1967
Tineola bisselliella (Hummel, 1823) - common clothes moth, webbing clothes moth

References

Tineidae
Tineidae genera
Taxa named by Gottlieb August Wilhelm Herrich-Schäffer